The transcendentals (from transcendere "to exceed") are "properties of being", nowadays commonly considered to be truth, beauty, and goodness. The concept arose from medieval scholasticism, but originated with Plato, Augustine, and Aristotle. Viewed ontologically, the transcendentals are understood to be what is common to all beings. From a cognitive point of view, they are the "first" concepts, since they cannot be logically traced back to something preceding them.

From the time of Albertus Magnus in the High Middle Ages, the transcendentals have been the subject of metaphysics. Although there was disagreement about their number, there was consensus that, in addition to the basic concept of being itself (ens), unity (unum), truth (verum) and goodness (bonum) were part of the transcendental family. though in some cases he follows the typical list of the transcendentals consisting of the One, the Good, and the True. The transcendentals are ontologically one and thus they are convertible: e.g., where there is truth, there is being and goodness also.

In Christian theology the transcendentals are treated in relation to theology proper, the doctrine of God. The transcendentals, according to Christian doctrine, can be described as the ultimate desires of man. Man ultimately strives for perfection, which takes form through the desire for perfect attainment of the transcendentals. The Catholic Church teaches that God is truth, goodness, and beauty, as indicated in the Catechism of the Catholic Church. Each transcends the limitations of place and time, and is rooted in being. The transcendentals are not contingent upon cultural diversity, religious doctrine, or personal ideologies, but are the objective properties of all that exists. 

Modern integral philosophy seeks to integrate these values, Will, Intellect, and Emotion within the individual at the microcosmic level.

See also
 Transcendence (philosophy)

References

Bibliography 
 Jan A. Aertsen, Medieval Philosophy and the Transcendentals: the Case of Thomas Aquinas, Leiden: Brill, 1996.
 Jan A. Aertsen, Medieval Philosophy as Transcendental Thought. From Philip the Chancellor (ca. 1225) to Francisco Suárez, Leiden: Brill, 2012.
 John P. Doyle, On the Borders of Being and Knowing. Late Scholastic Theory of Supertranscendental Being, Leuven: Leuven University Press, 2012.
 Graziella Federici Vescovini (éd.), Le problème des Transcendantaux du XIVe au XVIIe siècle, Paris: Vrin, « Bibliothèque d’Histoire de la Philosophie », 2001.
 Bruno Pinchard (éd.), Fine folie ou la catastrophe humaniste, études sur les transcendantaux à la Renaissance, Paris, Champion, 1995.
 Piero di Vona, Spinoza e i trascendentali, Napoli: Morano, 1977.

External links 

 Jan Aertsen on the History of Transcendentals. An Annotated Bibliography

Concepts in metaphysics
Ontology